The Fresno River (Spanish for "ash tree") is a river in Central California and a major tributary of the San Joaquin River. Although called the 'Fresno' River, it is one of the largest and longest river systems in Madera County.

Course

Headwaters:
The Fresno River forms in the Oakhurst valley, near the western border of city limits. The primary source of the Fresno River is Lewis Fork Creek, which gathers water far northeastward into the hills adjacent to Fish Camp. Lewis Fork Creek itself has a major tributary from Nelder Creek, coming from the lower-montane Nelder Grove area and Speckerman Mountain (7,600 ft). The other major tributary is China Creek, which acts as a drainage for the ridges around the Teaford Saddle. After Oakhurst, the Fresno River runs northwest until it reaches the end of the sloped valley at the calm topography of the Fresno Flats. There the valley and hills start to meet, and the Fresno crosses Potter Ridge at around 2,000 feet.

Foothills:
As the river carves its way through the ridge, it creates several windy canyons and gulches. This area was mildly popular during the Central Sierra era of the Gold Rush, throughout the early to mid-1850s. Past the ridge, the Fresno River descends the foothills mildly. The harsh canyons ease up and start to widen. It crosses Road 415 at around 1,000 feet elevation, an intersection known as the Fresno Crossing.

Hensley Lake:
Once the Fresno River gets out of the foothills, it creates a gently sloped river valley down to the border of the Central Valley. At one of the widest sections of the river, Hidden Dam was constructed and Hensley Lake created. Now a popular recreation spot, the lake covers a considerable area when full from late spring snow melts. 
 
Central Valley:
Below the lake, the river flows southwest to Madera, then west to the Eastside Bypass. The river exits the bypass then flows generally northwest to its confluence with the San Joaquin River, just north of Highway 152.

Lakes and dams
Hidden Dam is the only major storage dam on the Fresno River. The dam forms Hensley Lake, a  reservoir. The United States Army Corps of Engineers built the earth-fill dam, which was completed in 1974. Its primary purpose is flood control, but it is also used to regulate flows for irrigation and groundwater recharge. In 1978, the lake was opened to the public for recreation and is a popular boating and fishing destination for locals.

Below Hidden Dam, the Fresno River provides water to Madera Lake via an unnamed distributary. Excess flow from the lake is returned to the Fresno River by the lake's dam. The dam was built by the United States Bureau of Reclamation in 1964 and is operated by the Madera Irrigation District. From this point, the river is normally dry. The only time water is released past here is when water levels are high enough to spill over the dam.

Lower river
West of Road 17 in Madera County, the Fresno River's natural riverbed has been subject to much intervention by man and as a result, the natural riverbed has many gaps in it, which are now connected by man-made canals.

At Road 17, the natural riverbed has been modified to divert most flows into a manmade canal, which leads to the Eastside Bypass. Water can also be allowed to continue flowing down the main river channel (north of the man-made canal), but that water now ends up in the bypass as well.

Once in the bypass, water can exit via a small channel at a diversion dam and continue west along the natural riverbed the rest of the way to the San Joaquin River. Between the Eastside Bypass and the San Joaquin River, the riverbed (which is almost always dry) has been subject to straightening, but more or less follows its natural course.

Tributaries
In addition to many small unnamed streams, the Fresno River receives the water from the following streams:
Oak Creek, considered by some to be the headwater of the Fresno River beginning at Pierce Lake
China Creek
Miami Creek
Crooks Creek
Coarsegold Creek
Spangle Gold Creek
Willow Creek
Mud Spring Creek
China Slough
South Fork Fresno River
This is a distributary that branches off to form a small island, then returns to the mainline Fresno River.
Berenda Slough

Towns
Towns along the Fresno River include:
Oakhurst (unincorporated)
Madera

Crossings

There are numerous crossings over the Fresno River in Madera and Merced Counties. Crossings are listed here beginning at the source and working downstream:
Madera County above Hensley Lake
Crane Valley Road (Road 426)
State Route 41
River View Drive
Dupfy Fire Road (Road 8084)
Ellerbrock Station Road
Raymond Road (Road 415)
Madera County below Hensley Lake
Daulton Road (Road 603)
California High-Speed Rail Fresno River Viaduct (under construction)
City of Madera
East Cleveland Avenue
North Lake Street
North D Street
North Gateway Drive
State Route 99
Schnoor Avenue
North Granada Drive
Madera County below the City of Madera
Road 23
Road 20
Road 19
Road 16
Road 9
Road 1
Merced County
State Route 152

References

United States Bureau of Reclamation

Rivers of the Sierra Nevada (United States)
Tributaries of the San Joaquin River
Rivers of Madera County, California
Rivers of Merced County, California
Geography of the San Joaquin Valley
Sierra National Forest
Madera, California
Rivers of Northern California
Rivers of the Sierra Nevada in California